NGC 1310 is a barred spiral galaxy located in the southern constellation of Fornax. It was discovered by English astronomer John Herschel on 22 October 1835.

At a distance of 72 million light-years (22 Mpc) away from the Sun, NGC 1310 is a member of the Fornax A subgroup of the Fornax Cluster of galaxies.

In 1965, a supernova was discovered about 14 arcseconds east and 7 arcseconds south of the center of NGC 1310; it was subsequently designated SN 1965J.

References

External links
 

Discoveries by John Herschel
Spiral galaxies
Fornax (constellation)
Astronomical objects discovered in 1835
1310
012569